The 2021–22 Egyptian Basketball Super League was the 47th season of the Egyptian Basketball Super League, the highest-level basketball league in Egypt. The defending champions were Zamalek; they were eliminated in the semifinals by Al Ittihad Alexandria. 

The season began on 26 September 2021 and finished on 16 May 2022. Al Ahly won its sixth league title (its first since 2016); they qualify for the regular season of the 2023 season of the Basketball Africa League (BAL).

Teams

Team changes 

Sixteen teams competed in this season – the top fourteen of the previous season and two teams that were promoted from the Egyptian Second Division. Heliopolis and Al Shams joined as promoted teams. Al Zohour and Geziret El-Ward were relegated from the 2020-21 season.

Arenas and locations

System
Egyptian Basketball Super League is the basic and qualifying league for the BAL Championship. The league consists of three stages:
(1)The preliminary stage: where 1 meets 16, 2 meets 15, and so on in terms of ranking in the Mortabt-League.
(2)The regular league: After the rise of eight teams compete among themselves In back and forth matches.
(3)Playoffs stage: It starts from the final round, where the 1st place holder of the regular league meets the 8th place holder in a series of three matches, then the semi-finals and the final is a series of 5 matches.

Regular season

The preliminary stage
The first-placed team in the league will meet the 16th-ranked team, the second will meet the 15th, and so on.
Mortabt-League teams ranking

Matches 
Source=  goalzz.com

|}

Result

Regular season

Top Group

Results

Bottom Group

Playoffs
The playoffs began on 19 March 2022 and ended on 16 May 2022. All three rounds are played in a best-of-five format.

Bracket

Quarterfinals
The quarterfinals were played on 19, 21, 24, 26 and 28 March 2022.

|}

Semifinals
The semifinals were played on 22, 24 and 26 April 2022.

|}

Finals
The finals were played on 8 May, 10 May, 12 May (also 14 May and 16 May if necessary). All games were hosted at the Hassan Moustafa Sports Hall.

|}

Individual awards

References

Egyptian Basketball Super League
Egypt
Egypt